Nicolai Gennadyevich Dubinin, O.F.M. Conv. (born 27 May 1973) is a Russian Roman Catholic prelate as the Titular Bishop of Aquae in Byzacena and Auxiliary bishop of Roman Catholic Archdiocese of Mother of God at Moscow since 30 July 2020.

Life
Dubinin was born in a family of intelligentsia as the younger among two children in the present day Southern Federal District. His paternal relatives were local Russian Orthodoxes while his maternal relatives were Roman Catholics in Byelorussian SSR. According to the Belarus rules for mixed unions, he had to be christened as Roman Catholic as a second child in a family. Nevertheless, he was "unfairly" christened in the Moscow Patriarchate just like his older sister.

After graduation of the school education, joined Faculty of Philology at the Rostov State University (1990–1993), but subsequently entered to the Order of Friars Minor Conventual in 1994; he made a profession on September 8, 1995 and a solemn profession on October 3, 1998, and was ordained as priest on June 24, 2000, after graduation of the Major Franciscan Theological Seminary in Łódź, Poland and Catholic University in Lublin, Poland.

He returned to Russia and began to work in the Franciscan parishes and as superior of the different local Franciscan communities, with the break during 2002–2005, when he studied at the Pastoral Liturgical Institute in Padua, Italy with the licentiate of the Liturgical Theology degree. From 2005 until 2018 he served as a General Custos of the Order of Friars Minor Conventual in Russia and at the same time was a lecturer at the Major Theological Seminary of Mary – the Queen of Apostles in Saint Petersburg, Russian Federation.

On July 30, 2020, he was appointed by the Pope Francis as an Auxiliary Bishop of the Roman Catholic Archdiocese of Mother of God at Moscow and Titular Bishop of Aquae in Byzacena. On October 4, 2020, he was consecrated as bishop by Metropolitan Archbishop Paolo Pezzi and other prelates of the Roman Catholic Church in the Cathedral of the Immaculate Conception in Moscow.

References

External links 

  Coat of Arms with Description (1 September 2020)
  "Catholics in Russia Are Neither the Tourists Nor a Ghetto" (18 August 2020) on Nezavisimaya Gazeta
  And Now "the Doors of Catholic Church Welcome Everyone" (21 August 2020) on Novaya Gazeta
  Franciscan Bishop: "The Goal to ′Catholicize Russia′ Has Never Been of Ours" (3 October 2020) on RIA Novosti

1973 births
Living people
People from Rostov Oblast
John Paul II Catholic University of Lublin alumni
Conventual Friars Minor
Conventual Franciscan bishops
21st-century Roman Catholic bishops in Russia
Russian people of Belarusian descent
Russian Roman Catholic bishops